Sue Bailey may refer to:
 Susan Bailey (born 1950), British psychiatrist and academic
 Sue Bailey (rowing) (born 1961), British rowing cox 
 Sue Bailey (table tennis) (born 1972), British para table tennis player 
 Sue Bailey Thurman (née Sue Elvie Bailey, 1903–1996), American author, lecturer, historian and civil rights activist